Anu Aggarwal (born 11 January 1969) is a former Indian model and actress. She is best known for her works in Aashiqui, Khal-Naaikaa, The Cloud Door and Thiruda Thiruda.

Early life and background
Anu Aggarwal was born on 11 January 1969 in New Delhi, and was raised in Delhi. She was a gold medalist in sociology at Delhi University. After a brief stint in modelling, and VJing, and appearance in the Doordarshan serial Isi Bahane (1988), she made her Bollywood debut with the musical blockbuster Aashiqui, following which she was much in demand.

In 1997 she joined Yoga in Bihar School of Yoga and stayed there as a Karmayogi. In 1999 she was back in Mumbai to pack her things and live in yoga to serve people when  a serious car accident happened, Aggarwal was in a coma for 29 days, which left her with no memory of her earlier life. After that in 2001 she became a monk. She lives in Mumbai and is single. She practices yoga . She quoted in one of her interviews "To feel strong, to walk amongst humans with a tremendous feeling of confidence and superiority is not at all wrong. The sense of superiority in bodily strength is borne out by the long history of mankind paying homage in folklore, song and poetry to strong women" .

From Self-made to Self-healed Anu an MSW, today works for the upliftment of society. She is a motivational TED featured speaker, runs Anu Aggarwal Foundation for mental health, environmental well-being, stress relief, discovering joy in the challenged times of today.

Filmography

See also
 List of Indian film actresses

References

External links

Indian film actresses
Female models from Delhi
1969 births
Living people
Actresses in Hindi cinema